The Eremin letter was a letter supposedly written by Colonel A. Eremin, a high-ranking member of the Okhrana, the secret police of the Russian Empire. It said that Joseph Stalin was an Okhrana agent that infiltrated the RSDLP and was providing information to the Tsar's police. It also said that when Stalin was elected to the Central committee of the Bolshevik party in 1910, he completely ceased to cooperate with the Okhrana. The claim that Stalin worked for the Okhrana has been made multiple times, but the Eremin letter is the only document that corroborates it.

Orlov's Life Magazine article 
In 1956, Soviet defector Alexander Orlov wrote an article for Life Magazine, "The Sensational Secret Behind the Damnation of Stalin", and according to him, the reason Stalin had purged Marshal Tukhachevsky and other members of the soviet military was because they discovered some documents which showed that Stalin had been a member of the Okhrana that infiltrated the bolshevik movement.  The first appearance of the letter was in this article, which later appeared in various other works, such as in Stalin's great secret by Isaac Don Levine.

Authenticity 
The predominant view of historians in the west and in the countries of the former Soviet Union, is that the letter is most likely a forgery. Stephen Kotkin, an acclaimed biographer of Stalin, said that it was normal for the Okhrana to cast doubts over genuine revolutionaries, by saying they were police agents. Both Leon Trotsky and Stalin came under suspicion of police collaboration, those rumours always followed Stalin, but they were accusations his enemies failed to prove. In a certain occasion, one former Okhrana chief boasted, triumphant, that the revolutionaries started to suspect each other, so that in the end none of them could trust each other.

References 

History of Russia
Joseph Stalin